Needle Tower is a public artwork by American sculptor Kenneth Snelson located outside of the Hirshhorn Museum and Sculpture Garden in Washington, D.C., United States.

Description

This 26,5 meter tall abstract sculpture is a tapering tower made of aluminum and stainless steel. The aluminum tubes act in compression, held in tension by the stainless steel cables threaded through in the ends of the tubes.

Acquisition

The piece was a gift of Joseph Hirshhorn in 1974.

Tensegrity

Snelson's unique sculpture style is well articulated in Needle Tower. 
The structure style displayed is known as "tensegrity," a description given by Snelson's former professor Buckminster Fuller to the melding of tension and structural integrity. According to Snelson: Tensegrity describes a closed structural system composed of a set of three or more elongate compression struts within a network of tension tendons, the combined parts mutually supportive in such a way that the struts do not touch one another, but press outwardly against nodal points in the tension network to form a firm, triangulated, prestressed, tension and compression unit.

Symbolism

Much has been said about the geometric shapes seen in Snelson's works. Looking up from the inside of Needle Tower one may see the Star of David. According to Snelson, his works are not symbolic and it's common to see six-pointed stars in his work. In Needle Tower the six pointedness comes from the natural geometry of the three compression struts that make up each layer. Sets of three alternate with left and right helical modules, adding up to six when viewed upwards from the base of the tower.

Conservation

In April 2010 conservation work was completed on the sculpture by the Hirshhorn Museum. It took 15 staff members to stand the tower upright after conservation completion.

Needle Tower II

A second Needle Tower, Needle Tower II, was completed in 1968 and was acquired by the Kröller-Müller Museum in 1971. The piece resides in the museum's sculpture garden.

Gallery

See also
 List of public art in Washington, D.C., Ward 2

References

External links
Curious Skeletons by NASA
Hirshhorn's collection entry
Needle Tower on Kenneth Snelson's website
Waymarking Entry for Needle Tower

Modernist sculpture
1968 sculptures
Helices
Hirshhorn Museum and Sculpture Garden
Sculptures of the Smithsonian Institution
Abstract sculptures in Washington, D.C.
Aluminum sculptures in Washington, D.C.
Outdoor sculptures in Washington, D.C.
Star symbols